Platidiidae is a family of brachiopods belonging to the order Terebratulida.

Genera

Genera:
 Aemula Steinich, 1968
 Amphithyris Thomson, 1918
 Annuloplatidia Zezina, 1981

References

Terebratulida